A Woman's Point of View is a studio album by the American soul singer Shirley Murdock. The album was released on May 31, 1988, and included the charting single "Husband".

Track listing

Personnel
Adapted from AllMusic

Shirley Murdock – primary artist, composer, vocals
Roger – congas, drums, guitar, horn, keyboards, Electric piano, background vocals
Gregory Jackson – keyboards, background vocals
Robert "Rumba" Jones – cheng, congas
Roger Lynch – keyboards
Billy Beck – keyboards, background vocals
Aaron Blackmon – guitar, rhythm guitar, horn
Sherman Fleetwood – horn
Larry Troutman – cheng, background vocals
Lester Troutman – drums
Dale Degroat – keyboards, background vocals
Jannetta Boyce – background vocals
Raymond Davis – background vocals
Larry Hatcher – background vocals
Michael Warren – engineer

References

1988 albums
Shirley Murdock albums
Elektra Records albums